Seisen University refers to either:
Seisen University (Shiga), a university in Shiga Prefecture
Seisen University (Tokyo), a women's college in Tokyo.